Adrián Eduardo Goide Arredondo (born ) is a Cuban volleyball player. He is part of the Cuba men's national volleyball team and played in the 2016 Summer Olympics. On club level he plays for Brasília Vôlei.

Notes

References

External links
 profile at FIVB.org
 
 Adrián Eduardo Goide at the 2019 Pan American Games
 Player profile at Volleybox.net

1998 births
Living people
Cuban men's volleyball players
Place of birth missing (living people)
Olympic volleyball players of Cuba
Volleyball players at the 2016 Summer Olympics
Pan American Games medalists in volleyball
Pan American Games silver medalists for Cuba
Volleyball players at the 2019 Pan American Games
Medalists at the 2019 Pan American Games
21st-century Cuban people